John McCready was the founder of the RTC record label in New Zealand. He was also the general manager of CBS Records, New Zealand.

Background
Prior to mid-1974, McCready was working at Phonogram in New Zealand as the GM of their creative division. In the late 1970s, he formed his own record label, RTC. The label was the licensee for the catalogue of Virgin Records in New Zealand. This opened the door for him to work at CBS records.

He started with CBS Australia in March 1981. By January 1982, he was in charge of the Australian operation.

During the 1980s, McCready was GM of Radio Hauraki. Later he moved into television.

References

External links
 John McCready's blog
 moments like these (NZ Musician article about John McCready)
 NZ On Screen - John McCready

New Zealand record producers
Living people
Year of birth missing (living people)